The Aircraft Accident Investigation Bureau (AAIB) is a division of the Ministry of Civil Aviation, Government of India which investigates aircraft accidents and incidents in India.

Statutory Backing 
Earlier, the Directorate General of Civil Aviation (DGCA) conducted investigations and gave information to the investigations established by the Court of Inquiry and the Committee Inquiry. A separate investigative agency was established to comply with the Standards And Recommended Practices (SARPs) of the International Civil Aviation Organisation (ICAO).

The agency was established by Order No. AV-15029/002/2008-CG dated May 26, 2011. The Aircraft (Investigation of Accidents and Incidents) Rules, 2012 came into effect on 5 July 2012. It provides for setting up of an Aircraft Accident Investigation Bureau.

Investigations 
 AAIB, India has carried out more than 150 Accident and Incident investigations so far including major accident in 2020 of Air India Express Flight 1344 -

See also 
 Bureau of Civil Aviation Security
 International Civil Aviation Organization
 Airline codes
 Aviation Safety
 Directorate General of Civil Aviation (India)
 Airport Authority of India
 Commission of Railway Safety - Railway safety investigator

References

External links
 Aircraft Accident Investigation Bureau

2012 establishments in India
Government agencies of India
Aviation organisations based in India
Organizations investigating aviation accidents and incidents
Ministry of Civil Aviation (India)